In shogi, Feint Ranging Rook (陽動振り飛車 yōdōfuribisha) is a Ranging Rook opening in which the player first gives the impression that they are playing a Static Rook position, which subsequently switches to a Ranging Rook position. 

This strategy is intended to surprise the opponent and hopefully catch the opponent in a suboptimal position.

The impression of a Static Rook position is created by pushing the player's rook pawn forward (on the second file is played by Black or the eighth file if played by White).

Castle

Instead of the usual Mino castle, Feint Ranging Rook often uses a Top Knot Mino (ちょんまげ美濃 chonmage minō) castle.

Game examples

See also

 Static Rook
 Ranging Rook
 Shogi opening
 Mino castle

References

Bibliography

 勝又清和 『消えた戦法の謎』 毎日コミュニケーションズ 1995年
『将棋世界2010年12月号』 日本将棋連盟
 羽生善治 『変わりゆく現代将棋（下）』 日本将棋連盟 2010年

External links

 Shogi Weekly: 
 Feint Swinging-Rook Strategy (1)
 Feint Swinging-Rook Strategy (2)
 Shogi (etc) Diary in Japan: Feint Swinging Rook

Shogi openings
Ranging Rook openings